Apeiruss is a Bangladeshi EDM music composer, music producer and DJ duo. They are one of the pioneers of EDM in the mainstream Bangladeshi music industry. Apart from Bangladesh, they have also done several music production and composition for Bollywood film songs and singles. They are one of the most prominent EDM act of Bangladesh. They first came to attention when they released their track called “Bijoyer Shopno” back in 2014. They produced "Cholona Harai" for Tahsan which went viral on YouTube. They have done several Bollywood music production for Amaal Mallik, Armaan Malik (Zindegi Aa Raha Hoon Main, Sau Aasman, Buddhu Saa Mann etc.) &  Arko Pravo Mukherjee (Dariya Dance mix, Saalam-E-Ishq etc.). In October 2019, a new single "Ishqam" was released by Mika Singh and Ali Quli Mirza and it was entirely composed and produced by Apeiruss.

Career

Early days
Apeiruss was formed in 2014 by Saami, Shafi & Andy. Saami & Shafi were brothers. From a very early age they were developing their music production skills using FL Studio on a windows computer. They taught themselves basic music production techniques using software. In 2010 Saami met Andy in college. Later Saami, Shafi and Andy teamed up and formed Apeiruss. At the very beginning they were looking for a name for their band. Then 'Apeiruss' name was suggested by one of their friends named Akash. 'Apeiruss' came from Greek word 'Apeirose' which means 'Infinity'. In 2014 Their first song as Apeiruss 'Bijoyer Shopno' featuring Mehrab, Rinty and Borno was released from their YouTube channel.

Working in Bangladesh
After 'Bijoyer Shopno' Apeiruss started their journey in the local music industry. They would later work with many prominent Bangladeshi artists as music composer and producer. Some of their notable Bangladeshi songs are 'Cholona Harai' with Tahsan, 'Leelabali' with Mala & Uptown lokolz, 'Shudhu Amar' with SHUNNO, 'Obosheshe' featuring Naumi, 'Ami Tumi' featuring Elita Karim, Hotaath with Balam etc.

Working in Bollywood
Back in 2015 Apeiruss's then manager Tanzil Rahman sent some of their demos to various places. One day Bollywood playback singer Armaan Malik checked out their music and showed interest to work with them. Then he introduced Apeiruss with his brother Amaal Mallik. Amaal offered Apeiruss to produce a track he was composing for Atif Aslam. Apeiruss worked on that track as an additional programmer. The song became a massive hit. Through this song they started their Bollywood journey. They would later produce more songs of Amaal Mallik including 'Sau Aasman', 'Buddhu Sa Mann' etc. Amaal introduced Apeiruss with Arko Pravo Mukherjee with whom they did couple more songs. 
In 2017 Apeiruss asked Armaan Malik to sing a Bengali Song. Together they made 'Tor Karone' which was sung by Armaan Malik and composed by Apeiruss. It was the first Bangladeshi song for Armaan Malik.
In 2019 Apeiruss composed 'Ishqam' with Bollywood playback singer Mika Singh and Ali Quli Mirza. The song was released from Navrattan Music in October 2019. In November they released 'Dil Ki Masti' featuring Rumman Chowdhury which was featured in a short film called 'Naina Da Kasoon' produced by Mika Singh. Recently in 2020 Apeiruss produced a song named "Mareez E Ishq (reloaded)" composed and sang by Shaarib Sabri and it got released from Sony Music India. Apeiruss produced music for the background themes of very popular TV show called Ishq Main Marjawan 2 and also produced romantic, sad songs of the drama in collaboration with Shaarib-Toshi.

Discography

Singles
2014
Halfway to Heaven
#Duckface (feat. Amid)

2015
Without You feat (Akash)
Reborn (feat. Stephan neera & Kaizer kaiz)

2016
Obosheshe (feat. Naumi)
Bhalobeshe Niruddeshe (feat. Tahsan & Moon)
Abstraction (with Tanzil Hasan)
Fight For You

2017
Tor Karone (feat. Armaan Malik)
Shudhu Amar with SHUNNO
Dangerous (feat. Bigg Spade)
Down For Your Love (feat. Rumman Chowdhury)
Joss Na? (with Beatbaksho)
Hammer On
Leelabali (feat. Mala & Uptown Lokolz)

2018
Nao Chariya De (feat. Palbasha)
Janiye Dao (feat. Mithun Chakra)
Jitbe Amar Team (Dance version) with Shuvo, Tahsan, Xefer, Kona, Momtaz, & Mizan.

2019
Ami Tumi (Feat. Elita Karim)
Khola Akash (Feat. Tasnim Anika & Balam)
Hothaat with Balam
Ishqam with Mika Singh & Ali Quli Mirza
Dil Ki Masti (feat. Rumman Chowdhury)
Shunno Pata (feat. Lamiya Chowdhury)
Keno Tumi Nai (feat. TahseeNation & Rumman Chowdhury
Schizophrenia (Feat. Lamiya Chowdhury)
Doob (remake) with Borno
2020

 Mrito Jonaki (ft. Sabbir Nasir) 
 Mareez E Ishq Reload (Produced, Mixed & Mastered by Apeiruss) 
 Anarosher Pizza by Apeiruss

References

External links
Facebook
Instagram
Twitter 
Spotify
Soundcloud

Bangladeshi electronic music groups
2014 establishments in Bangladesh